The 1901 Virginia gubernatorial election was held on November 5, 1901 to elect the governor of Virginia.

Results

References

1901
Virginia
gubernatorial
November 1901 events